Somena similis is a moth in the family Erebidae. It was described by Frederic Moore in 1860. It is found from India to Sundaland.

References

Moths described in 1860
Lymantriinae